West Michigan Regional Airport , formerly Tulip City Airport, is a public-use airport located two nautical miles (3.7 km) south of the central business district of Holland, a city in Ottawa County and Allegan County, Michigan, United States. It is included in the Federal Aviation Administration (FAA) National Plan of Integrated Airport Systems for 2017–2021, in which it is categorized as a national general aviation facility.

The airport is owned by Holland, Zeeland, and Park Township and operated by the West Michigan Airport Authority.  The airport relies on user fees, federal and state grants, and donations to operate.  A provision in the city charter that prohibits tax dollars from being used for airport operations. 

Although many U.S. airports use the same three-letter location identifier for the FAA and IATA, this airport is assigned BIV by the FAA and no designation from the IATA (which assigned BIV to Bria Airport in Bria, Central African Republic).

History
The airport originally opened in the 1940s as a private grass strip. It was first known as the Tulip City Airport.

The airport was originally owned by a private individual and then a corporation. In 1982, it was sold to the city of Holland so it could support public corporate traffic coming into the area. Residents initially opposed the sale because they didn't want tax dollars going towards the airport. However, since federal funds can't be relegated to private airports, the airport was bought by the city using private funds.

A regional airport authority was authorized by area voters in November 2008.  The West Michigan Airport Authority consists of representatives from Holland, Zeeland, and Park Township.  In October 2011 the airport authority formally voted to change the airport's name from Tulip City Airport to West Michigan Regional Airport.

In 2014, a new business center opened on airport property to support the local fixed-base operator and airport authority.

The airport's terminal received an upgrade in 2016 with donations provided by local businesses and residents. Upgrades include an expanded aircraft ramp and a new parking lot for cars. A new terminal was also built, replacing a building that was first constructed in the 1950s. As part of the upgrade, the airport purchased adjacent farmland and relocated a ditch near the airport.

In 2017, the airport received an Airport Sponsor of the Year award from the Michigan Department of Transportation to recognize sustained excellence in service to the aviation community through the development of numerous airport improvement and infrastructure preservation projects. This specific award was specifically granted to recognize the airport's efforts in building the Airport Business Center and Aircraft Apron projects.

The airport also received new funds for upgrades through the FAA's Airport Improvement Program in 2019.

Activities
The airport hosted an Aviation Day in partnership with Wings of Mercy in 2022. It included a pancake breakfast, a 5K race on the airport's runway, and free airplane rides sponsored by the EAA Young Eagles.

In 2021, the airport was a stop on the Civil Air Patrol's Operation Good Cheer to deliver gifts to children in need in the area.

Facilities and aircraft 
It has one runway designated 8/26 with an asphalt surface measuring 6,002 by 100 feet (1,829 x 30 m). Passenger loading is from the tarmac. Flights range from light sport aircraft to business jets; it has no regularly scheduled commercial flights. A full-service fixed-base operator (FBO) offers aircraft rental, flight instruction, charter flights, and aircraft maintenance.

The airport has two public viewing areas. One is located near the southwest corner of the airport (accessed from 64th Street), and the other is located on the northeast corner of the airport (accessed from Lincoln Avenue). Both are paved and equipped with a picnic table.

There is a fixed-base operator at the operator which sells fuel and provides general maintenance, courtesy transportation, rental cars, a conference rooms, a crew lounge, snooze rooms, and other amenities.

For the 12-month period ending December 31, 2021, the airport had 35,000 aircraft operations, an average of 96 per day: 94% general aviation, 6% air taxi, and 1% military. At that time there were 49 aircraft based at this airport: 29 single-engine and 7 multi-engine airplanes as well as 13 jets.

Accidents and incidents
On March 20, 2001, a Cessna 172 Skyhawk was substantially damaged while performing a touch-and-go at West Michigan Regional. After full throttle had been applied to go around, the airport veered off the runway and struck two lights. The pilot reported the aircraft swerved in both directions, and he retarded the throttle just before the aircraft entered the grass. The aircraft then hit a taxiway light, crossed over the airport taxiway, and the aircraft came to a stop. The probable cause was found to be the pilot's failure to maintain directional control of the airplane.
On December 4, 2002, a Cessna 172 Skyhawk veered off runway 26 and struck a snow bank while landing at West Michigan Regional. The probable cause was found to be the student pilot's failure to maintain directional control during landing roll. Additional factors include the student pilot's lack of total flight experience, his CFI's inadequate supervision, and the ice and snow on the runway.
On March 6, 2006, a Beech J35 Bonanza sustained substantial damage on impact with a roadway embankment following a reported loss of engine power while on approach to runway 8 at West Michigan Regional. The probable cause was found to be a loss of engine power due to fuel starvation as a result of the pilot's improper fuel system management and failure to select a tank containing fuel.
On October 6, 2011, an amateur-built Brinkerhuff Q-200 collided with an approach light and the terrain while landing at West Michigan Regional. The pilot was on approach after a number of touch-and-go landings when he contacted an approach light stanchion. The aircraft then contacted the ground and came to rest inverted in the grass approximately short of the approach end of the runway. The probable cause was found to be the pilot's failure to maintain sufficient altitude during the landing approach, which resulted in the airplane contacting an approach light.
On June 28, 2014, a Cessna 172 Skyhawk crashed while landing at West Michigan Regional. The aircraft touched down hard and bounced before departing the side of the runway, coming to rest in a grassy area. The left main landing gear buckled and damage was sustained to the empennage. The probable cause was found to be the pilot's improper recovery from a bounced landing resulting in a loss of directional control.
On January 17, 2015, a Cessna 172 Skyhawk encountered a strong, gusting crosswind while landing at West Michigan Regional. The aircraft's left wing was lifted and veered right, and the pilot lost control. The aircraft existed the runway and impacted a snow bank, where it nosed over and came to rest inverted. The probable cause was found to be the pilot's loss of control while landing in gusty wind conditions.

References

External links 
 Tulip City Air, the fixed-base operator (FBO)
  at Michigan DOT Airport Directory
 Aerial image as of 4 May 1997 from USGS The National Map
 

Airports in Michigan
Buildings and structures in Allegan County, Michigan
Transportation in Allegan County, Michigan